Erica Wagner is an American author and critic, living in London, England. She is former literary editor of The Times.

Biography
Erica Wagner was born in New York City in 1967. She grew up on the Upper West Side and went to the Brearley School. As a child she had epilepsy.

She moved to Britain in the 1980s to continue her education, first at St Paul's Girls' School, then at Corpus Christi College, Cambridge (BA), and finally at the University of East Anglia (MA), where she was taught by Malcolm Bradbury and Rose Tremain. She holds an honorary doctorate from the University of East Anglia and is Goldsmiths Distinguished Writers' Centre Fellow, an appointment made in January 2022.

She is the author of several books, including a collection of short stories, Gravity, Ariel's Gift: Ted Hughes, Sylvia Plath, and the Story of Birthday Letters, and the novel Seizure. Her latest book is a biography of Washington Roebling, the engineer who constructed the Brooklyn Bridge.

Wagner was literary editor of The Times between 1996 and June 2013. She reviews for The New York Times and many other publications, including the New Statesman (for which she is a contributing writer), the Economist, the Observer, the Financial Times. Wagner was selected to be one of the judges for the Man Booker Prize in both 2002 and 2014. She has judged many other literary prizes as well. She is Lead Editorial Innovator at Creatd, Inc.

She lives in London with her husband, the writer Francis Gilbert, author of I'm a Teacher, Get Me Out of Here, Teacher on the Run and Yob Nation. They have a son, Theo.

Bibliography

 Gravity (Granta, 1997)
 Ariel's Gift: Ted Hughes, Sylvia Plath and the Story of Birthday Letters (Faber & Faber/W. W. Norton, 2000)
 Seizure (Faber & Faber, W. W. Norton, 2007)
 First Light: A Celebration of Alan Garner (Unbound, 2016)
 Chief Engineer: The Man Who Built the Brooklyn Bridge (Bloomsbury, 2017)
 Mary and Mr Eliot: A Sort of Love Story (Faber & Faber/Farrar, Straus & Giroux, forthcoming 2022/2033)

References

1967 births
Living people
Alumni of Corpus Christi College, Cambridge
Alumni of the University of East Anglia
American expatriates in England
Brearley School alumni
New Statesman people
People educated at St Paul's Girls' School
People with epilepsy
The Times people
Writers from New York City